On 27 May 2017, a Let L-410 Turbolet operating as Summit Air Flight 409 crashed short of the runway whilst attempting to land at Tenzing–Hillary Airport in Nepal. The captain and the first officer died as a result of the accident, while another crew member received injuries.

Aircraft
The aircraft involved by the crash was a Let L-410, built in 2014 for Summit Air (then operating as Goma Air), registration 9N-AKY. The aircraft was involved in a prior minor accident on 2 June 2015, where the flight from Jomsom landed in Pokhara with the nose gear retracted. All 18 passengers on board were safe, but the aircraft suffered damage to its nose.

Crew
The Captain, 48 year-old Parash Kumar Rai, had over 9000 flight hours logged, and since joining the airline, had flown over 1900 hours on L-410 aircraft. He died shortly after being pulled from the wreckage. The co-pilot, Shreejan Manandhar died at 21:30 local time in intensive care at Lukla Hospital. The cabin crew member survived the crash and was soon medically evacuated to Kathmandu for further treatment.

Accident
At about 14:04 local time, the aircraft was on final approach to Runway 06 of Tenzing-Hillary Airport, on a routine flight from Tribhuvan International Airport, when it descended below the minimum safety altitude just off the runway and impacted with a tree and contacted ground three metres below the runway. It then slid over 200 meters down a ravine. CCTV footage released by the airport showed the aircraft dipping below the runway level and smoke rising from the wreckage. Witnesses stated that the weather conditions had been foggy, and that visibility was quite low. The airport does not possess any sort of navigational equipment, requiring pilots to land via visual approach. The up-slope runway 06 is without any instrument approach guidance. At the time of the accident, local visibility was substantially reduced by ground fog.

Investigation
After the accident, it was suspected that the probable cause of the accident was an aerodynamic stall brought on by low approach speed. Due to the abnormally short runway on Lukla, aircraft are required to approach the airport at very low speeds, making the aircraft extremely vulnerable to sudden downdrafts and strong winds that are known to occur in the mountains. Contributing factors might include poor visibility on final approach and the inexperience and lack of technology available to air traffic control.

In December 2017, an investigation committee of the Civil Aviation Authority of Nepal submitted its final report on the accident and concluded that "Very low visibility" was the cause of the accident. As the aircraft was flying through dense fog for several minutes before the approach, it missed the runway of Lukla Airport. The report furthermore revealed that both air traffic control of Lukla Airport (who did not close the airport despite the foggy weather) and the crew of Flight 409, who are also suspected to have been stressed and fatigued, had violated standard operating procedures. Lastly, the committee suggested that a runway extension of Lukla Airport should be considered, which would make the airport, where several accidents have occurred in the past, safer.

Aftermath
Contrary to common practices in aviation, Summit Air did not retire the flight number 409 and still operates the flight from Kathmandu to Lukla under this number.

See also
Yeti Airlines Flight 103
Buddha Air Flight 103
2012 Agni Air Dornier 228 crash

References

Aviation accidents and incidents in Nepal
2017 in Nepal
Aviation accidents and incidents in 2017
Solukhumbu District
May 2017 events in Asia
Accidents and incidents involving the Let L-410 Turbolet
Accidents_and_incidents_involving_cargo_aircraft
Airliner accidents and incidents caused by weather
2017 disasters in Nepal